Fand Mons is a mountain in Venus, situated at 7°,0 N-158°,0 E. The name is a homage to Fand, Celt goddess of healing and pleasure. The name was given in 2001 by the Working Group for Planetary System Nomenclature (WGPSN) of the International Astronomical Union (IAU).

References

Surface features of Venus